Adalet Cimcoz (25 July 191013 March 1970) was a Turkish voice actress, art curator, critic, translator and gossip columnist. She dubbed many film stars over a period of more than thirty years. She also opened and curated Turkey's first and only woman-owned private art gallery for exhibitions of painting, sculpture, mosaic, ceramics, photography, patterns, and folk art. She critiqued literature, art, and theatre for twenty years. She translated a number of classical works of European literature from German to Turkish. She was also a gossip columnist under the pen name "Fitne Fücur" ("The Mischief-maker)".

Private life
Adalet was born to Hüseyin Tayfur and his wife Aliye in Kilitbahir village of Eceabat district in Çanakkale Province,  then Ottoman Empire, on 25 July 1910. Her father was an artillery Colonel of the Ottoman Army stationed at the Dardanelles as the commander. of Kilitbahir Castle. Her mother was a German, whom her father met during an official military mission in the German Empire. She converted to Islam from Christianity after her marriage, and took the name Aliye. Adalet had two older brothers Hayri and Ferdii.  Ferdi Tayfur would be also a voice actor.

In 1916, Adalet went to Germany with her family. She finished her primary education in 1921, and then completed her secondary education in Germany.

In 1939, she married Mehmet Ali Cimcoz. Thanks to her husband, who was a lawyer and had a social circle of friends in arts and politics, she met and became associated with notable people in arts and literature, among them Sabahattin Ali, Nâzım Hikmet, Cemal Tollu, Bedri Rahmi Eyüboğlu, Ercüment Kalmık, Avni Arbaş, Kuzgun Acar, Ara Güler, and many more.

Career

Voice actress
Cimcoz, who was working at the Agricultural Products Bureau as a translator, entered voice acting upon the recommendation of her voice actor brother Ferdi Tayfur. She dubbed for lead characters in both domestic and foreign films. She also provided support to her brother by dubbing for major female roles. Among the actresses she dubbed for were Türkan Şoray, Hülya Koçyiğit, Belgin Doruk, Fatma Girik, Filiz Akın, Muhterem Nur, and Neriman Köksal in numerous films. Her career in voice acting extended from 1936 until her death in 1970.

Cimcoz used the language of the common people. She adopted the expressions of the people heard during her childhood years in her father's house in the Kocamustafapaşa quarter of Old Istanbul. Finding the opportunity to watch all the tours of the traditional theater where she lived, she also performed the shadow play Karagöz and Hacivat at home. She transferred new and original folk expressions, and imitations of dialects captured from master Karagöz artists, to film. The owner of Lale Film, for whom Cimcoz worked many years, said that "she translated Ottoman Turkish language or foreign words and terms given in the screenplay into pure Turkish by making the dialogues kindly but firmly".

Filmography ( Voice ) 

 Aşk Mabudesi (Türkân Şoray) - 1969
 Sonbahar Rüzgarları (Türkân Şoray) - 1969
 Otobüs Yolcuları (Türkân Şoray) - 1969
 Hayatım Sana Feda (Türkân Şoray) - 1969
 Bana Derler Fosforlu (Türkân Şoray) - 1969
 Köroğlu(Fatma Girik) - 1968
 İstanbul Tatili - 1968
 Artık Sevmeyeceğim (Türkân Şoray) - 1968
 Kahveci Güzeli (Türkân Şoray) - 1968
 Kelepçeli Melek (Türkân Şoray) - 1967
 Eli Maşalı (Türkân Şoray) - 1966
 Düğün Gecesi (Türkân Şoray) - 1966
Fakir Bir Gencin Romanı (Filiz Akın) - 1965
 Serseri Aşık (Hülya Koçyiğit) - 1965
Taçsiz Kral (Ajda Pekkan) - 1965
 Siyah Gözler (Türkân Şoray) - 1965
 Hayatımın Kadını(Türkân Şoray) - 1965
 Veda Busesi(Türkân Şoray - 1965
 Vahşi Gelin (Türkân Şoray) - 1965
 Yılların Ardından (Türkân Şoray) - 1964
 Fıstık Gibi Maşallah (Türkân Şoray) - 1964
 Öksüz Kız (Türkân Şoray) - 1964
Öp Annenin Elini (Fatma Girik) - 1964
 Çalınan Aşk (Türkân Şoray) - 1963
Sipsevdi (Ajda Pekkan)  - 1963
Belali Torun  (Fatma Girik) - 1962
 Kırmızı Karanfiller (Türkân Şoray) - 1962
Yalnizlar Için (1962)  (Belgin Doruk) - 1962
Zorlu Damat(Türkân Şoray) - 1962
 Otobüs Yolcuları (Türkân Şoray) - 1961
 Melekler Şahidimdir (Türkân Şoray) - 1961
 Aşk Rüzgarı (Türkân Şoray) - 1960
Aslan yavrusu (1960) (Leyla Sayar) - 1960
 Sahildeki Kadın - 1954

Art curator
On 5 December 1950, Cimcoz opened an art gallery named "Maya" in Beyoğlu, Istanbul. It was the country's first private art gallery curated by a woman and remained the only one until its closure in 1955. Cimcoz started new exhibition concepts at the Maya Art Gallery. She prepared exhibitions with paintings inspired by poetry or music, and opened cartoon exhibits to support the acceptance of caricature as an art, in addition to mounting exhibitions of painting, sculpture, mosaic, ceramics, photography, patterns, and folk arts. Her presentation of the subjects in tandem realized an interdisciplinary dimension for the first time in art. Among the various works exhibited at Maya Art Gallery were those by Cemal Tollu, a member of the artist collective Group D, and by Melda Kaptana. Organized by the Friends of Art Association which Cimcoz co-founded, 61 works of women painters were on display in the gallery. Cimcoz also curated exhibitions to support child cartoonists.

Critic
Between 1950 and 1970, Cimcoz critiqued literature, art, and theatre for the periodicals Yeditepe, Varlık, and Yeni Ufuklar.

Translator
Already in her early years, Cimcoz became well-known for her translations of poems from German to Turkish. From 1957 on, she translated German works by such authors as Berthold Brecht, Knut Hamsun, Georg Büchner, B. Traven, Lope de Vega, Franz Kafka, T. Tibor Déry, and Max Frisch into Turkish.

Gossip columnist
Cimcoz was one of the first gossip columnists of Turkey, writing under the pseudonym "Fitne Fücur" (literally: The Mischief-maker).

Awards
1962 "Translation" Award of the Turkish Language Association for the Letters to Milena by Franz Kafka.

Death and legacy
Cimcoz died of cancer on 13 March 1970 in Istanbul, aged 59. She was interred at Aşiyan Asri Cemetery.

The state-owned Turkish Radio and Television Corporation published a documentary film on Cimcoz's life on 1 December 2011. Her life is told in a 1972-published book titled Adalet Cimcoz-Bir Yaşamöyküsü Denemesi by Mine Söğüt.

Translations
Following is a list of Cimcoz's translations:
 Ölüm Gemisi (The Death Ship by B. Traven, novel, 1957)
 Sezuanın İyi İnsanı (The Good Person of Szechwan by Bertold Brecht, play and three stories, 1961)
 Milena’ya Mektuplar (Letters to Milena by Franz Kafka, 1961)
 Dinamit (literally: Dynamite) (B. Traven, stories, 1963)
 Leonce ile Lena (Leonce and Lena by Georg Büchner, play, 1963)
 Galileo Galilei (Life of Galileo by Bertold Brecht, play, 1963)
 On Dakka Sonra Buffalo (Ten Minutes to Buffalo by Günter Grass, 1964)
 Bay Puntila ile Uşağı Matti (Mr Puntila and his Man Matti by Bertold Brecht, play 1965)
 Eğlentili Bir Gömme Töreni (literally: A Funny Burial Ceremony) (Tibor Déry, stories, 1967)
 Kafka’nm Sevgilisi Milena (Kafkas Freundin Milena by Margarete Buber-Neumann, 1967)
 Adanmış Topraklar Üstünde (literally: On the Promised Land) (Ephraim Kishon, satire, 1969)

References

1910 births
1970 deaths
People from Çanakkale Province
Turkish art curators
Turkish women curators
Turkish voice actresses
Turkish critics
Turkish translators
Gossip columnists
Deaths from cancer in Turkey
Burials at Zincirlikuyu Cemetery
20th-century translators